John Ellis  Griffith Jr. (July 10, 1936 – November 10, 2002) was an American musician.

Biography
Born in Detroit, Griffith was a musician who played keyboards for Motown Records' in-house studio band, The Funk Brothers. Among Griffith's most notable performances on the hundreds of Motown recordings he played on are the electric piano on "I Heard It Through the Grapevine" by Marvin Gaye and "Ain't Too Proud to Beg" and by The Temptations, and the organ on "Stop! In the Name of Love" by The Supremes and "Shotgun" by Junior Walker & the All Stars. Griffith also played on many of the non-Motown releases with the Funk Brothers, such as "Cool Jerk" by The Capitols and "(Your Love Keeps Lifting Me) Higher and Higher" by Jackie Wilson.

Griffith played the Steinway grand piano, the Hammond B-3 organ, the Wurlitzer electric piano, the Fender Rhodes, and the celeste and harpsichord. His musical influences included Bud Powell, Glenn Gould, and Oscar Peterson.

Griffith died of a heart attack in a Detroit hospital on November 10, 2002.  He was 66 years old.

References

External links

1936 births
2002 deaths
African-American pianists
American soul musicians
Musicians from Detroit
The Funk Brothers members
American soul keyboardists
20th-century American pianists
American male organists
Rhythm and blues pianists
American session musicians
20th-century organists
American male pianists
20th-century American male musicians
20th-century American keyboardists
20th-century African-American musicians
21st-century African-American people